Regional Cancer Centres (RCCs) are cancer care hospitals and research institutes operating in India under the joint control and funding of the Government of India and the respective state governments. The name 'regional' because each of these institutions cater to a designated region, usually a number of districts in the country. There are presently 25 such centres spanning all the states and union territories of India. This system works under the National Cancer Control Programme which started in 1975 under the Ministry of Health and Family Welfare (India). The scheme originally started with 5 RCCs for 5 designated regions of the nation. Later this number was increased in steps. The present number of RCCs is more than 25 and the union government is planning to assign RCC status to more regional cancer hospitals. In 2011, Chief Minister Oommen Chandy looked to have Malabar Cancer Centre, Thalassery upgraded to the level of a regional cancer centre.

Regional Cancer Centres in India 
Regional Cancer Centres, presently approved and funded by the central government are:

References 

 
Hospital networks in India